Agricultural Museum is a museum about agriculture in Jasin Town, Jasin District, Malacca, Malaysia. The museum building was originally the first post office in Jasin Town, before it was converted into a museum, which opened to public in October 1990. The museum displays the historical activities and the economy of the local Jasin people in the fields of agriculture.

See also
 List of museums in Malaysia
 List of tourist attractions in Malacca
 Agriculture in Malaysia

References

1990 establishments in Malaysia
Jasin District
Museums established in 1990
Museums in Malacca